Shree Bhagavathi (Mahishamardini) Ammanavara Temple is located in Gundmi village, Saligrama, Udupi district.

It is a nicely-built temple for a very powerful goddess Mahishamardini, also called as Ammanavaru by beloved devotees. This temple has a typical garbhagriha, prakaram, hebbagilu, pond (thirtha).

There are Nandikeshwara, Naga devru, Kshetrapaala and Rakthakshi around the main deity as its family of gods in the temple premises.

During Dussehra, Navratri is celebrated with great enthusiasm and has a huge following. This is very special as this is celebrated in a turn basis by the family of Maiya's as they follow this deity as their mane/kula devathe.

References

Hindu temples in Udupi district